David Cunniff (born October 9, 1970) is an American former professional ice hockey player. He was hired as the head coach of the Worcester Railers of the ECHL during the 2019–20 season.

Playing career
Cunniff played his college hockey at Salem State College. He then played eight seasons of professional hockey in the AHL and ECHL, scoring 38 goals and 44 assists, with 555 penalty minutes, in 268 professional games played.

Coaching career
For the 2002–03 season, Cunniff joined the Cleveland Barons of the AHL as an assistant coach, retaining that position when the team relocated to become the Worcester Sharks in 2006. On September 12, 2012, Cunniff was promoted to associate coach of the Worcester Sharks, working alongside head coach Roy Sommer. In June 2014, Cunniff left the Worcester Sharks.

On September 15, 2014, the Albany Devils added David Cunniff as an assistant coach, joining Sergei Brylin and goaltending coach Johan Hedberg on head coach Rick Kowalsky’s staff.

On August 11, 2015, the Iowa Wild hired Cunniff as an associate coach. On February 13, 2016, Cunniff was announced as the interim head coach of the club following the promotion of John Torchetti to the Minnesota Wild. Torchetti became the interim head coach following the dismissal of Mike Yeo. He returned to the associate position at the end of the 2015–16 season when Derek Lalonde was hired as the Iowa Wild head coach.

In 2019, he became an assistant coach with the Hartford Wolf Pack. On November 27, 2019, he was named the head coach and general manager of the Worcester Railers in the ECHL.

References

External links

1970 births
Albany River Rats players
American ice hockey coaches
American men's ice hockey left wingers
Ice hockey players from Massachusetts
Jacksonville Lizard Kings players
Living people
Louisiana IceGators (ECHL) players
Raleigh IceCaps players
Richmond Renegades players
Ice hockey coaches from Massachusetts